Toba Tek Singh is a city and capital of Toba Tek Singh District in the Pakistani province of Punjab. It is surrounded by cities of Gojra, Kamalia, Rajana, Pir Mahal and Shorkot.

History
The city and district is named after a Sikh religious figure Tek Singh. Legend has it that Mr. Singh, a kind hearted man, served water and provided shelter to the worn out and thirsty travelers passing by a small Pond ("toba" in Punjabi) which eventually was called Toba Tek Singh, and the surrounding settlement acquired the same name.

British Raj
Toba Tek Singh was developed by the British toward the end of the 19th Century when a canal system was built. People from all over the Punjab (currently Indian and Pakistani Punjab) moved there as farmlands were allotted to them. Most of the people who migrated there belonged to Lahore, Jalandhar, Hoshiarpur District. The Imperial Gazetteer of India described the tehsil of Toba Tek Singh as follows:

Tahsil of the new Lyallpur District, Punjab, lying between 30°50' and 31°23' N. and 72° 20' and 72°54' E., with an area of 865 square miles (2,240 km2). The population in 1906 was 148,984. It contains 342 villages, including Toba Tek Singh (population,1,874), the headquarters, and GOJRA (2,589), an important grain market on the Wazirabad -Khanewal branch of the North-Western Railway. The land revenue and ceases in 1905-6 amounted to 4.7 lakhs. The tahsil consists of a level plain, wholly irrigated by the Chenab Canal. The soil, which is very fertile in the east of the tahsil, becomes sandy towards the west. The boundaries of the tahsil were somewhat modified at the time of the formation of the new District of Lyallpur"

Modern
During the 1970s, when many Pakistani cities were renamed to change names given after British Rulers to their original or native names or more acceptable names to local population - for example, Montgomery returned to its original name Sahiwal -  Toba Tek Singh remained one of the very few cities to maintain its original name mainly because of reputation of Tek Singh. In 1982 Toba Tek Singh, formerly a subdivision, was separated from Faisalabad District and became a separate district.

Kisan conference 1970
In Toba Tek Singh, the Left parties held a farmers' conference on March 23-25, 1970, which was led by Maulana Bhashani. The farmers' conference made Toba Tek Singh famous in the country. Toba Tek Singh was chosen to host the farmers' conference because it was not only an important agricultural area but also had left-wing ideological leaders present before the partition of India.

Gas pipeline explosion
On the evening of October 23, 1999, SNGPL employees were repairing a 26-inch diameter pipe at the wall assembly station on Jhang Maghiana Road of SNGPL's main pipeline passing through Toba Tek Singh city. An explosion set fire to the assembly station and surrounding houses, burning 13 people, including 11 employees, to death and injuring dozens.

Demography

Toba Tek Singh is located in central Punjab and occupies 3,252 square kilometers and is made up of large areas of lowlands that flood frequently during the rainy season; the floods originate from the Ravi River that runs along the southern and southeastern borders. The pre-partition T.T. Singh had a sizable Sikh population, much of which migrated to Punjab in modern India in 1947.

Economy

Agriculture
Toba Tek Singh is one of the best producers of oranges, locally known as kenno. It contributes towards export standard quality of oranges produced in all Pakistan. The majority of people living in this district work in agriculture and the region produces several kinds of agricultural and dairy products, including meat, eggs, cotton, maize, several pulses, peaches, guava, tomato, melon, water melon, mangoes, tobacco, onion.

Notable people

Sardar Muhammad Chaudhry Ex-Inspector General, Punjab Police (June 1991 to 1 June 1993).
Tabraiz ShamsiSouth African Cricketer (Debut 2016).
Amjad Javed Saleemi Ex-Inspector General, Punjab Police (October 2018 to April 2019).
Riaz Fatyana MNA (PTI) NA-113 Chairman Standing Committee on law and Justice Member Public Account Committee, Convenier SDG's, Member NACTA EX Minister for Education,Finance and Information punjab.
Muhammad Junaid Anwar Chaudhry  MNA NA112-NA93 Ex Minister Postal and communication services, Member Public Account Committee.
Chaudhry_Mohammad_Sarwar 33rd Governor of Punjab.
Nabeel (actor)

Educational Institutes

 St. Peter's High School
 Divisional Public School & College, Toba Tek Singh
 Bahria Foundation College Toba Tek Singh
 Convent of Jesus and Mary high school, Toba Tek Singh
 Ken Public High School
 Govt Graduate College, Toba Tek Singh

In fiction

Saadat Hasan Manto, an Urdu Novelist, wrote a short story entitled "Toba Tek Singh" which is a satire on the partition of Punjab; in the story, an inmate in an asylum frets over the question of whether his home town Toba Tek Singh is now in India or Pakistan. It was adapted into a short movie of the same name directed by Pakistani filmmaker Afia Nathaniel in 2005. In 2006 Sarmad Sehbai dramatized "Toba Tek Singh" for Pakistan Television which was aired on Pakistan Television on December 3, 2006.
It has also been made into an Indian short film by Ketan Mehta. Rapper Riz Ahmed released a track titled the same name in his 2020 album, "The Long Goodbye".Toba Tek Singh (film)

See also

 Boota from Toba Tek Singh

References

External links
 "The story of Toba Tek Singh"
 
"The official homepage of local government Toba Tek Singh."
  Toba Tek Singh Punjab Govt. website

Cities in Punjab (Pakistan)
Populated places in Toba Tek Singh District
Toba Tek Singh District